Martin Bláha (born 12 September 1977) is a Czech former professional racing cyclist. He rode at the 2014 and 2015 UCI Track Cycling World Championships.

Major results

1995
 3rd  Team pursuit, UCI Junior Track World Championships
2009
 3rd  Madison, UCI Track Cycling World Championships (with Jiří Hochmann)
2010
 1st  Madison, UEC European Track Championships
2011
 1st  Points race, National Track Championships
 2nd  Madison, UCI Track Cycling World Championships (with Jiří Hochmann)
2012
 1st  Madison, UEC European Track Championships
2014
 2nd  Madison, UCI Track Cycling World Championships (with Vojtěch Hačecký)
 8th Tour of Yancheng Coastal Wetlands
2015
 National Track Championships
1st  Scratch
1st  Team pursuit
 5th Overall Tour of Yancheng Coastal Wetlands
2017
 1st  Scratch, National Track Championships
 7th GP Slovakia, Visegrad 4 Bicycle Race

References

External links

1977 births
Living people
Czech male cyclists
Sportspeople from Brno
Czech track cyclists